Sociedade Desportiva Serra Futebol Clube, usually known simply as Serra is a Brazilian football club from Serra, Espírito Santo state. The club won the Campeonato Capixaba six times.

Serra is currently ranked fourth among Espírito Santo teams in CBF's national club ranking, at 163rd place overall.

History
The club was founded on July 24, 1930. They won the Campeonato Capixaba in 1999, 2003, 2004, 2005, 2008 and in 2018.

Current squad (selected)

Achievements
 Campeonato Capixaba:
 Winners (6): 1999, 2003, 2004, 2005, 2008, 2018

References

Association football clubs established in 1930
Football clubs in Espírito Santo
1930 establishments in Brazil